RBBS may refer to:

Robert Bradley's Blackwater Surprise
Republic Bashkir Boarding School
RBBS-PC, a bulletin board system